Luca Ladner (born 26 April 1989) is a footballer from Switzerland who plays as midfielder for Baden.

Career
Ladner began his career 1996 at FC Engstringen where he played for five years before joining Grasshopper in March 2001. After six years with Grasshopper he joined city rivals Zürich in July 2007. He won his first appearance in the AXPO Super League on 23 July 2008 in a match against Lucerne.

After having played 20 matches (2 goals) in the reserve team, Ladner joined FC Wohlen on 28 January 2009 on a loan spell until the end of the season. He is expected to rejoin parent club FC Zürich on 1 July 2009.

International
He used to be a national player for Switzerland at youth level.

Privates
Luca is the son of FC Zürich's assistant manager and former professional player Andy Ladner.

External links
 
 Rot Weiss Profile
 Teamchef.ch Profile
football.ch

References

1989 births
Footballers from Zürich
Living people
Swiss men's footballers
Association football midfielders
Switzerland youth international footballers
Grasshopper Club Zürich players
FC Zürich players
FC Wohlen players
FC Schaffhausen players
FC Baden players
Swiss 1. Liga (football) players
Swiss Super League players
Swiss Challenge League players
Swiss Promotion League players